The common splayfoot salamander or common flat-footed salamander (Chiropterotriton chiropterus) is a species of salamander in the family Plethodontidae. It is endemic to the Huatusco–Xalapa region of Veracruz, Mexico. Several unnamed species might exist under this name.

Its natural habitat is cloud forest where it occurs in bromeliads and moss. It is threatened by habitat loss caused by deforestation.

References

Chiropterotriton
Endemic amphibians of Mexico
Taxonomy articles created by Polbot
Amphibians described in 1863